Into the Abyss, subtitled A Tale of Death, a Tale of Life, is a 2011 documentary film written and directed by Werner Herzog about two men convicted of a triple homicide that occurred in Conroe, Texas. Michael Perry received a death sentence for the crime. The documentary also features an interview of Perry's accomplice, Jason Burkett, who was spared execution.

The film was first shown on September 3, 2011, at the Telluride Film Festival, and had its official world premiere on September 8, 2011, at the 2011 Toronto International Film Festival. After strong festival showings and a surge of interest in the issue of capital punishment in the United States, Herzog requested that the film be rushed into general theatrical release, which occurred on November 11, 2011.

Synopsis
The film profiles Michael James Perry (April 9, 1982 – July 1, 2010), a man on death row convicted of murdering Sandra Stotler, a 50-year-old nurse. He also confessed to two other murders which occurred in Conroe, Texas. Perry was convicted of the October 2001 murder 8 years before filming; the crimes apparently were committed to steal a car for a joyride. Perry denies that he was responsible for the killings.

Perry's final interviews for the film were recorded only eight days before his execution on July 1, 2010. The film also includes interviews with victims' families and law-enforcement officers.

The film does not focus on Perry's guilt or innocence and features a minimal amount of narration, with Herzog never appearing onscreen, unlike in many of his films.

Production
Herzog had long considered making a film about prison inmates. In fact, Herzog, at age 17, had intended to make his first film about the maximum-security Straubing prison in Bavaria. This concept was never realized, but the idea remained dormant until Into the Abyss decades later.

The film was financed by American cable TV channel Investigation Discovery, which gave Herzog financing and creative freedom.

The film went through several working titles during its production. For a time, it was called simply Death Row, and this was later elaborated to Gazing Into The Abyss: A Tale of Death, a Tale Of Life. The television broadcast of the film and the related series was briefly referred to as Werner Herzog’s Final Confessions, but eventually aired with the title On Death Row.

Certain voices in the production wanted the film's title to be The Red Camaro, but Herzog disliked the hint of product placement in the title, and called it "not evocative at all". By August 2011, when its premiere at TIFF was announced, the title was changed to Into the Abyss. Herzog has often commented that Into the Abyss could have worked well as the title of many of his films.

Herzog originally planned and shot profiles of five death-row inmates in Texas and Florida, including Michael Perry. After production began, Herzog decided to focus on Perry's case. His other interviews were compiled into a series of four 50-minute films which aired as the television miniseries On Death Row.

The film was in production during promotion for Herzog's previous film Cave of Forgotten Dreams. Herzog missed a special screening of Cave at the Berlinale festival because an opportunity to film one of his subjects arose suddenly.

Release and distribution
The film's premiere was in September 2011 at the 2011 Toronto International Film Festival. The film was often portrayed as being one among several "hot-button political documentaries" at the festival. Herzog, however, has stated that he has no political intentions with the film. Herzog states at the film's outset that he opposes capital punishment, but he has said that his "focus is elsewhere" in the film. In an interview with the Los Angeles Times, he said, "This is not an issue film; it's not an activist film against capital punishment," and, "Yes, it has an issue, but it's not the main purpose of the film."

Before the film's festival premiere, North American theatrical distribution rights were bought by Sundance Selects. In October 2011, Sundance Selects announced that the film would be rushed to a theatrical release, opening in select cities on November 11, 2011. In recent months, controversies have arisen over American capital punishment in the case of Troy Davis and the cheers for Rick Perry's execution record in a Republican primary debate.
The early release was demanded by Herzog himself, who wanted his film to contribute to this new national discussion of the death penalty. Producer Erik Nelson said, "Everyone in the country is focused on the death-penalty debate again thanks to Rick Perry and the bloodthirsty yahoos at the Republican debate, and I think Werner wants the film to be part of that discussion because timing is everything."

After a theatrical release, the film was shown on Investigation Discovery, which provided the film's financing. It was available for on-demand video streaming on Netflix but no longer.

Reception
The film has received positive reviews. On Rotten Tomatoes, it has a 92% "certified fresh" rating, based on reviews from 111 critics. On Metacritic, it has a score of 74 out of 100 based on 30 reviews, indicating "generally favorable reviews."

The film appeared as number three on Roger Ebert's list of the 20 best documentaries of 2011.

Awards
 2011 BFI London Film Festival, Best Documentary

See also
 List of people executed in Texas, 2010–2019
 List of people executed in the United States in 2010

References

External links
 

2011 films
American documentary films
Capital punishment in Texas
2011 documentary films
Films directed by Werner Herzog
Documentary films about capital punishment in the United States
Documentary films about crime in the United States
British documentary films
American prison films
British prison films
German prison films
2010s English-language films
2010s American films
2010s British films
2010s German films